Audrey Grosclaude (born 29 September 1980) is a French rhythmic gymnast. She competed in the women's group all-around event at the 1996 Summer Olympics.

References

External links
 

1980 births
Living people
French rhythmic gymnasts
Olympic gymnasts of France
Gymnasts at the 1996 Summer Olympics
People from Tassin-la-Demi-Lune
Sportspeople from Lyon Metropolis
20th-century French women
21st-century French women